Sergey Nikolaevich Tsukanov (born June 22, 1973), known as The Cemetery Maniac, is a Soviet-Russian serial killer and rapist who killed eight women in Likhvinka and Tula at two different time spans. The first murders, between 1989 and 1991, were committed when he was 16 years old, with the latter occurring between 1998 and 1999. In 2000, Tsukanov was found incapable to stand trial and sent to involuntary commitment in a psychiatric clinic.

Biography 
Sergey Tsukanov was born on June 22, 1973, in Tula. He was a single child, living together with his parents and paternal grandmother in a one-room apartment. While his mother and father were loving and law-abiding citizens, his grandmother was a badly-tempered woman who constantly criticized her family and engaged in conflict, causing Sergey to develop a deep-seated hatred against her. In his teenage years, Tsukanov began to show aggressive and misogynistic behavior towards older, plump women, as they reminded him of his grandmother. He attended School No. 13 in Tula, where, in 1988, he attacked the headteacher in the toilets, attempting to rape her. However, she recognized him, forcing Tsukanov to cease his attack and flee. The school administration covered up the incident and never reported it to the authorities, but Tsukanov was sent to a mental health clinic for a psychiatric evaluation. During one of the surveys, Tsukanov revealed that the motive for the attack was revenge for bad grades, but during the struggle, he had become aroused by the sight of his victim's full thighs and buttocks and decided to rape her then and there. He also disclosed older women were subjects of his sexual fantasies. The psychiatrists eventually concluded that Tsukanov had a mild intellectual disability but was declared sane and released. He returned to school, where he soon began persuading one of his classmates to be his girlfriend. After he was rejected, Sergey's mental state degraded, leading him to self-harm by cutting his skin with knives and other sharp objects. Soon after, a series of murders began to occur in the city.

Murders 
Tsukanov committed his first murder in December 1989, killing a 54-year-old flour mill worker in the village of Likhvinka. During the course of the investigation, an employee at the mill, a convicted felon who was known to dislike the victim, was briefly considered a suspect, but he provided a solid alibi and was thus excluded. In the fall of 1990, Tsukanov attacked an elderly factory worker en route to her home, while she was crossing a bridge overlooking the Voronka River. During the attack, Tsukanov stabbed her in the back, but was unable to kill her as passers-by were approaching. The victim was taken to a nearby hospital, temporarily managing to survive, and later gave a detailed description of her assailant. This allowed authorities to develop an identikit of the offender. Soon after, due to complications arising from her injuries, the woman died. In March 1991, Tsukanov tried to kill an elderly woman in the city's forest park, but she resisted fiercely, managing to fight him off and even causing him to lose his knife. Five days later, Tsukanov attacked another woman, raping and then hitting her on the head with a stone several times, killing her on the spot. While investigating the previous attack, authorities established that the dropped knife had been welded with rebar. While conducting searches at the various factories around Tula, which had welding machines and similar devices, the police found that similar knives were used by the teenage workers at the local railway depot. Following this discovery, all citizens who had been convicted of sexual crimes or registered in psychiatric clinics were inspected for possible involvement, and during said investigations, the authorities learned about the 1989 attack on the teacher committed by Tsukanov. In August 1991, shortly after leaving school, Tsukanov was detained. While police were unable to find evidence connecting him to any of the killings, depot workers identified him as the customer who had bought the knife, and the surviving victim was also convinced that Tsukanov was her assailant. Upon learning this, Tsukanov himself confessed to committing the three murders. At the request of his lawyers, he was ordered to undergo a psychological examination at the Kursk Psychiatric Hospital, which declared that Tsukanov was sane. However, this verdict was disputed by Tsukanov, his parents and lawyer alike, with the latter arguing that the examination had been rife with errors. At the upcoming trial, the court was incapable of applying capital punishment, as the suspect was considered a minor under criminal law. Due to this, at the end of 1991, Tsukanov was found guilty on all charges and sentenced to 10 years imprisonment, the maximum penalty available for minors at the time. After his conviction, he was transferred to the Novomoskovsk corrective labor colony, where he befriended fellow convict Anatoly Denisov. With Denisov's help, Tsukanov mastered the joiner profession, diligently working for the entirety of his sentence. He was considered a model prisoner and never reprimanded by prison officials, which helped influence the decision to grant him early parole in the summer of 1998. After his release, Tsukanov returned to his parents' home in Tula, and a few months later, he found a job as a carpenter at a local firm and even found himself a girlfriend. However, due to their conflicting personalities and his lack of sexual attraction towards the girl, Tsukanov broke up with her and began to abuse alcohol. Soon after, he resumed his killing spree.

All of the subsequent murders took place at the Smolenskoye Cemetery in Tula, popularly known as "Soup Mountain", thanks to which Tsukanov would later be nicknamed "The Cemetery Maniac" and "The Maniac from Soup Mountain". On August 19, 1998, during Apple Spas, the drunk Tsukanov ended up in the cemetery, where he came across 80-year-old Anastasia Sazykina, who was visiting the graves of her relatives. Tsukanov attacked her, raping and then beating the victim to death with a metal pipe. On October 11, he attacked again, beating and raping 72-year-old Vera Evplova, before killing her with a shovel he had brought with him. A few days after this attack, on October 30, he struck again, raping and killing 86-year-old Klavdia Vlasova by stabbing her with her own umbrella. On November 16, Tsukanov stalked 65-year-old Nadezhda Romanova, who was visiting the cemetery with her husband and sister-in-law. For some time, the trio were walking along the same route, after which Romanova left them and went to another part of the cemetery, where a friend of hers was buried. Tsukanov used the opportunity to track down and attack her, raping and beating Romanova to death. After committing the crime, he attempted to leave the cemetery, but was caught by the groundskeepers, whose attention was drawn to his unkempt appearance and dirt on his knees. Suspecting that he had committed some sort of illegal activity, one of the workers went to the place from which Tsukanov emerged, finding Romanova's body a few meters away from a grave. This discovery prompted a whole group to go after the killer, but by that time, he had already fled the area. Authorities were notified, and using the witnesses' description, an identikit of the criminal was developed. Like with the previous investigation, several thousand people with a history of mental disorders or sexual offences were investigated. On March 28, 1999, Tsukanov and his parents were invited to a wake organized by 67-year-old Larisa Golubkova, in relation to her son's passing. After the ceremony ended, the drunken Tsukanov stumbled his way to Golubkova's front door late in the evening, demanding that she treat him to a bottle of vodka. Golubkova adamantly refused, saying that this wasn't a wedding, enraging him in the process. In a fit of anger, Tsukanov attacked her, raping and then stabbing the woman several times with a knife, killing her in the process. In an attempt to cover his tracks, he set the house on fire, but this was noticed by Golubkova's neighbors, who called the police. Based on their testimony, Tsukanov was arrested the very next day. As part of the investigation into the recent slew of murders, a blood sample was taken from him, matching his DNA to all of the crime scenes. After also being identified as Romanova's killer by the cemetery groundskeepers, Tsukanov confessed to all five murders. During the interrogations, he insisted that he had dissociative identity disorder, causing him to have problems with self-control.

Trial
In mid-1999, at a pre-trial hearing, Sergey Tsukanov's lawyers filed a petition to have him examined, which was granted. At the end of the year, Tsukanov was transferred to the Serbsky Center in Moscow, where specialists worked with him for the next two months. The end results concluded that Tsukanov had a form of schizophrenia, which rendered him incapable of understanding the gravity of his actions. On the basis of this, on January 20, 2000, the Regional Court of Tula acquitted him on the grounds of insanity and relieved him of criminal liability, ordering that Tsukanov spend the rest of his days in a psychiatric clinic. Following this verdict, Tsukanov was transferred to the intensive care unit of a clinic located in Oryol, and after October 2006, no reliable information about his further fate has been uncovered.

See also
 List of Russian serial killers

References

External links
 DACTYLOSCOPIC AND DERMATOGLYPHIC STUDY OF PAPILLARY PATTERNS OF SERIAL KILLERS (in Russian)
 "The 10th 'B' Maniac" - episode on The investigation was conducted... (in Russian)

1973 births
20th-century Russian criminals
Living people
Male serial killers
Minors convicted of murder
People acquitted by reason of insanity
People convicted of murder by Russia
People from Tula, Russia
People with schizophrenia
Prisoners and detainees of Russia
Russian people convicted of murder
Russian people convicted of rape
Russian prisoners and detainees
Russian male criminals
Russian rapists
Russian serial killers
Soviet rapists
Soviet serial killers